The following is a list of churches in the former local government area of North Dorset, England.

List 

 Gillingham Methodist Church
Sherborne Abbey
St James' Church, Shaftesbury
St John's Church, Enmore Green
 St Mary the Virgin, Gillingham, Dorset
 St Michael's Church, Over Compton

References

North Dorset
North Dorset
Churches